Linda Stone, a tech writer and consultant, coined the term continuous partial attention in 1998 to describe a modern adaptive behavior of continuously dividing one's attention. Stone has clarified that continuous partial attention is not the same as multi-tasking. Where multi-tasking is driven by a conscious desire to be productive and efficient, CPA is an automatic process motivated only by "a desire to be a live node on the network" or by the willingness to connect and stay connected, scanning and optimizing opportunities, activities and contacts in an effort to not miss anything that is going on.

Continuous partial attention is not necessarily a dysfunctional state. However, it may lead to increased stress and decreased ability to focus and concentrate on the present moment, prohibiting reflection, contemplation, and thoughtful decision making. The constant connectedness that is associated with continuous partial attention may also affect relationships, lower productivity levels, and lead to overstimulation and a lack of fulfillment.

Stone's research has focused on examples in the United States though she has posited that, "We may not all find ourselves in the same attention era at the same time. We are likely to find ourselves experiencing a flow: attraction to an ideal, taking the expression of the ideal to an extreme and experiencing unintended and less than pleasant consequences, giving birth to and launching a new ideal while integrating the best of what came before."

References 

Attention